Acystopteris is a genus of ferns in the family Cystopteridaceae.

Its three species include:

References 

Polypodiales
Fern genera
Taxa named by Takenoshin Nakai